The Finnish Women's Volleyball League is a women's volleyball competition organized by the Finnish Volleyball Federation (Suomen Lentopalloliitto Ry-SLRY), it was created in 1956.

History 
The 2018/19 League season was played in a regular season mode with a total of ten teams of which 8 are qualified for a title deciding Playoffs.
The 2019/20 season was cancelled due to COVID-19 spread in the country.
Vaasan Vasama and LP Viesti Salo are the most titled ones with 9 titles each.

List of Champions

Table by club

References

External links
 Finnish Volleyball Federation
  Finland Mestaruusliiga. women.volleybox.net 

Finland
Volleyball in Finland
Finnish
Sports leagues established in 1956
1956 establishments in Finland
Professional sports leagues in Finland
Women's sports leagues in Finland